Parankimamukal is a village situated near Pathanapuram in Kollam District, Kerala state, India.

Politics
Parankimamukal is a part of Thalavoor Grama panchayat, Pathanapuram Block panchayat and Kollam district Panchayat. It is a part of Pathanapuram assembly constituency in Mavelikkara (Lok Sabha constituency). K. B. Ganesh Kumar is currently serving as the MLA of Pathanapuram. Shri.Kodikkunnil Suresh is the current member of parliament of Mavelikkara.

Geography
Parankimamukal is a junction in Pathanapuram-Kottarakkara (via Kura) road. It connects places including Nadutheri, Randalummoodu etc. to Pathanapuram. It is the main part of the village.

Demographics
Malayalam is the native language of Parankimamukal.

References

Geography of Kollam district
Villages in Kollam district